The Jijioara or Gârla Morii is a right tributary of the river Jijia in Romania. It discharges into the Jijia near Larga-Jijia.

Tributaries

The following rivers are tributaries to the river Jijioara (from source to mouth):

Left: Borosoaia, Catargiu, Lacul Negru
Right: Păiș, Sbanț

References

Rivers of Romania
Rivers of Iași County